Elise Reed (born December 5, 1992) is an American mixed martial artist who competes in the Strawweight division of the Ultimate Fighting Championship.

Background
Reed started martial arts at six years old by competing in Taekwondo, then moving on to kickboxing at the age of 15. Having her first amateur fight at the age of 20, Reed competed on the amateurs while studying at the Virginia Military Institute. While at the school, Elise partook in Swimming and Water Polo at the NCAA Division I level, becoming the first female RXO at the school. Reed is still in the Army Reserve while owning and operating two schools in New Jersey named Kickside Martial Arts

Mixed martial arts career

Early career
Reed made her debut at atomweight against Rebecca Bryggman on October 25, 2019, at Bellator 231. She won the bout via TKO stoppage at the end of the first round.

Cage Fury Fighting Championships 
Reed faced Jasmine Jasudavicius for Cage Fury Fighting Championships strawweight title at Cage Fury Fighting Championships 83 on August 13, 2020. She won the fight via technical knockout in round two.

Reed defended her title against Jillian DeCoursey on December 18, 2020, at Cage Fury Fighting Championships 91. She won the fight via unanimous decision.

Reed faced Hilarie Rose on May 29, 2021, at age Fury Fighting Championships 97. She won the fight via technical knockout in round two and retained her title.

Ultimate Fighting Championship
Reed faced Sijara Eubanks on July 24, 2021, at UFC on ESPN: Sandhagen vs. Dillashaw. She lost the fight via technical knockout in round one.

Reed faced Cory McKenna on March 19, 2022, at UFC Fight Night: Volkov vs. Aspinall. She won the fight via split decision.

Reed faced Sam Hughes at UFC Fight Night: Holm vs. Vieira on May 21, 2022. She lost the via technical knockout in round three.

Reed next replaced Hannah Cifers to face Melissa Martinez at UFC 279 on September 10, 2022. She won the fight via unanimous decision.

Reed was scheduled to face Loma Lookboonmee on February 4, 2023, at UFC Fight Night 218. However, the pair was moved to 
UFC 284 for undisclosed reasons. She lost the fight via a rear-naked choke submission in the second round.

Championships and accomplishments
Cage Fury Fighting Championships
Cage Fury FC Strawweight Championship (One time)
Two successful title defenses

Mixed martial arts record

|-
|Loss
|align=center|6–3
|Loma Lookboonmee
|Submission (rear-naked choke)
|UFC 284
| 
|align=center|2
|align=center|0:44
|Perth, Australia 
|
|-
|Win
|align=center|6–2
|Melissa Martinez
|Decision (unanimous)
|UFC 279
|
|align=center|3
|align=center|5:00
|Las Vegas, Nevada, United States
|
|-
|Loss
|align=center|5–2
|Sam Hughes
|TKO (elbow and punches)
|UFC Fight Night: Holm vs. Vieira
|
|align=center|3
|align=center|3:52
|Las Vegas, Nevada, United States
| 
|-
|Win
|align=center|5–1
|Cory McKenna
|Decision (split)
|UFC Fight Night: Volkov vs. Aspinall
|
|align=center|3
|align=center|5:00
|London, England
|
|-
|Loss
|align=center|4–1
|Sijara Eubanks
|TKO (punches)
|UFC on ESPN: Sandhagen vs. Dillashaw
|
|align=center|1
|align=center|3:49
|Las Vegas, Nevada, United States
|
|-
|Win
|align=center|4–0
|Hilarie Rose
|TKO (elbows)
|Cage Fury FC 97
|
|align=center|2
|align=center|4:57
|Philadelphia, Pennsylvania, United States
|
|-
|Win
|align=center|3–0
|Jillian DeCoursey
|Decision (unanimous)
|Cage Fury FC 91
|
|align=center| 4
|align=center|5:00
|Lancaster, Pennsylvania, United States
|
|-
|Win
|align=center|2–0
|Jasmine Jasudavicius
|Decision (split)
|Cage Fury FC 83
|
|align=center| 4
|align=center|5:00
|Philadelphia, Pennsylvania, United States
|
|-
|Win
|align=center|1–0
|Rebecca Bryggman
|TKO (punches)
|Bellator 231
|
|align=center|1
|align=center|4:48
|Uncasville, Connecticut, United States
|

See also 
 List of current UFC fighters
 List of male mixed martial artists

References

External links 
  
 

1992 births
Living people
American female mixed martial artists
Strawweight mixed martial artists
Mixed martial artists utilizing taekwondo
Atomweight mixed martial artists
Ultimate Fighting Championship female fighters
American female taekwondo practitioners